Marcus Weller (born July 14, 1984), is an American entrepreneur and inventor of the Skully motorcycle helmet.

Career

Weller attended Wayne State University and studied psychology. A motorcycle accident inspired him to found Skully in 2013. Marcus now holds a Ph.D. in Industrial Psychology.

Skully Helmet

Weller invented the Skully AR-1. The AR-1 was to be the first vertically integrated, smart, Heads-Up Display (HUD) helmet for consumers. The AR-1 was to feature a near 180-degree rear-view camera, turn-by-turn GPS navigation, smartphone pairing and voice control. Weller also served as Skully CEO until July 2016, and the company shut down later the same month.

Weller with his brother and co-founder, Mitch Weller, were sued by Isabelle Faithauer, a former executive assistant, for fraudulently using Skully's corporate funds for personal use. The lawsuit was later dropped.

References

Businesspeople in information technology
1984 births
Living people